

428001–428100 

|-bgcolor=#f2f2f2
| colspan=4 align=center | 
|}

428101–428200 

|-id=102
| 428102 Rolandwagner ||  || Roland C. Wagner (1960–2012), a French author, journalist, literary critic, translator and sometime singer, who wrote dozens of sci-fi novels. His final novel, Reves de Gloire, won several literary awards. || 
|}

428201–428300 

|-id=259
| 428259 Laphil ||  || The Los Angeles Philharmonic, founded in 1919, is an American orchestra based in Los Angeles, California. It is widely considered one of the finest orchestras in the United States. || 
|}

428301–428400 

|-bgcolor=#f2f2f2
| colspan=4 align=center | 
|}

428401–428500 

|-bgcolor=#f2f2f2
| colspan=4 align=center | 
|}

428501–428600 

|-bgcolor=#f2f2f2
| colspan=4 align=center | 
|}

428601–428700 

|-id=694
| 428694 Saule ||  || Saulė is a solar goddess, the solar deity in both the Latvian and Lithuanian mythologies. || 
|}

428701–428800 

|-bgcolor=#f2f2f2
| colspan=4 align=center | 
|}

428801–428900 

|-bgcolor=#f2f2f2
| colspan=4 align=center | 
|}

428901–429000 

|-bgcolor=#f2f2f2
| colspan=4 align=center | 
|}

References 

428001-429000